Tomorrow is a Canadian drama film, directed by Maxime Giroux and released in 2009. The film stars Eugénie Beaudry as Sophie, a woman who begins a casual affair with Jérôme (Guillaume Beauregard) while caring for her ailing father Richard (Serge Houde), but finds it to be essentially a one-way relationship from which she wants more than Jérôme is prepared to give.

The film premiered at the 26th Torino Film Festival in 2008, before going into theatrical release in 2009.

References

External links

2008 films
2008 drama films
Canadian drama films
Films directed by Maxime Giroux
2000s Canadian films